Evergestis politalis is a species of moth in the family Crambidae. It is found in most of Europe (except Ireland, Great Britain, the Netherlands, Fennoscandia, the Baltic region and Greece), North Africa (including Algeria) and Central Asia (including Kyrgyzstan and Kazakhstan).

The wingspan is about 18 mm.

The larvae feed on Biscutella laevigata.

References

Moths described in 1775
Evergestis
Moths of Asia
Moths of Europe
Moths of Africa